Chris Aniskovich (born March 14, 1965) is an American politician who serves in the Connecticut House of Representatives representing the 35th district. The district is composed of Chris' hometown of Clinton, as well as neighboring Killingworth and the northern half of Westbrook. Chris has also served as Chair of the Clinton Town Council since its introduction in 2019.

Political career

2019 Clinton Town Council Election
Chris Aniskovich was elected to a four-year term on the Clinton Town Council on November 5th, 2019, receiving 1,473 votes (11.24%), the highest vote-getter in the group of 11 total candidates. He then was voted as Chairman of the Council and reelected as Chair after the 2021 elections. He also previously served on the Planning & Zoning Commission and Board of Assessment Appeals in Clinton.

2022 State Representative Campaign
Aniskovich focused on local issues that affected his community during his campaign. Aniskovich states that he is an advocate for low taxes, responsible spending, and increased community investment to tackle rising inflation. Aniskovich is also an advocate for coastal resiliency funding due to the district's proximity to Long Island Sound. He also is a supporter of localized control of zoning and school boards, in which he views that the local communities make the best decisions for themselves when it comes to local issues. Chris also is a supporter of increased funding for local police forces, noting that they need sufficient funding so that they can continue to do their jobs effectively.

2022 State Representative Election
Chris Aniskovich was elected in the general election on November 8, 2022, winning 50.96% of the vote over a combined 49.03% of Democratic/Independent candidate Christine Goupil and Green candidate Hugh Birdsall.  Chris began his first term on January 4, 2023. At the beginning of the 2023 session, Aniskovich announced that he would be on the Banking, Commerce, and General Law Committees in the Connecticut House of Representatives.

References

Living people
Republican Party members of the Connecticut House of Representatives
21st-century American politicians
People from Clinton, Connecticut

Year of birth missing (living people)